Fermín Vélez (April 3, 1959 – March 31, 2003) was a Spanish sports car racing driver, two-time winner of the 12 Hours of Sebring and two-time World Sportscar Championship Group C2 champion.

Vélez was a driver in the Indy Racing League, racing in the 1996–1997 seasons with six career starts, including two at the Indianapolis 500. Born in Barcelona, Spain, Vélez died there of cancer.

Vélez is honoured by the 24H Series sportscar race at the Circuit de Barcelona-Catalunya in Montmeló, where the race is called the Fermin Vélez Trophy.

Motorsports career results

24 Hours of Le Mans results

Complete International Formula 3000 results
(key) (Races in bold indicate pole position) (Races 
in italics indicate fastest lap)

American open wheel
(key)

IndyCar Series

Indy 500 results

References

1959 births
2003 deaths
Spanish racing drivers
IndyCar Series drivers
Indianapolis 500 drivers
International Formula 3000 drivers
24 Hours of Le Mans drivers
World Sportscar Championship drivers
12 Hours of Sebring drivers
24 Hours of Daytona drivers

Rocketsports Racing drivers